Ethmia miriamschulmanae is a moth in the family Depressariidae. The habitat consists of dry forests.

The costal half of the forewings is dark brown from the base to the termen, except for the apex, which is white enclosing two dots on the terminal line. The longitudinal line separates a dark costal half from the paler posterior half. There is a brown spot on the base at the premedial line. The hindwing ground color is whitish, getting dark towards the apical margin.

The larvae feed on Varronia guanacastensis.

Etymology
The species is named in honor of Miriam Schulman for her support of the beginning and growth of Área de Conservación Guanacaste.

References

Moths described in 2014
miriamschulmanae